is a division of Avex Pictures as of July 10, 2017, a Japanese developer and publisher of adult video games and visual novels. âge was formerly known as Relic and developed video games for consoles.  It gained fame following the release of its 2001 adult visual novel Kimi ga Nozomu Eien.  It was founded by Hirohiko Yoshida, Baka Prince Persia, Nanpuureima, Spin Drill, and  Carnelian.  âge games are published under the brands Âge, Mirage, and Φâge.

In 2011, âge created its own parent company "ixtl" as a rights management company for âge's content, particularly the Muv-Luv franchise. The company was jointly held by CEO Takashi Nakanishi, Nippon Cultural Broadcasting, and Good Smile Company. In 2017, Avex Pictures acquired ixtl (and thus âge), and later changed the company's name to "aNCHOR".

List of developed games

âge
Kimi ga Ita Kisetsu ~Primary~ (1997)
Kimi ga Ita Kisetsu (2011 remake)
Kaseki no Uta
Âge Maniax
Kimi ga Nozomu Eien (2001)
Kimi ga Nozomu Eien ~Special Fan Disc~ (2004)
Muv-Luv (2003)
Muv-Luv Supplement (Fandisc, 2004)
Muv-Luv Alternative (2006)
Muv-Luv Altered Fable (Fandisc, 2007)
Muv-Luv Alternative - Total Eclipse (2013)
Muv-Luv Alternative Chronicles 01 (2010)
Muv-Luv Unlimited The Day After Episode 00
Muv-Luv Alternative Chronicles Chicken Divers
Muv-Luv Alternative Chronicles Rain Dancers
Muv-Luv Alternative Chronicles 02 (2011)
Muvluv Unlimited The Day After Episode 01
Muv-Luv Alternative Chronicles Adoration
Muv-Luv Alternative Chronicles 03 (2012)
Muv-Luv Unlimited The Day After Episode 02
Muv-Luv Alternative Chronicles Resurrection
Muv-Luv Alternative Chronicles 04 (2013)
Muv-Luv Unlimited The Day After Episode 03
Muv-Luv Alternative Chronicles War Ensemble
Muv-Luv Alternative Chronicles Last Divers
Schwarzesmarken
Schwarzesmarken: Kouketsu no Monshou (2015)
Schwarzesmarken: Junkyousha-tachi (2016)

âge FC titles
Akane Maniax
Critical Moment! Daikūji
KimiNozo Duelist
Âge FC Collection Bundle-ban Banban
Ayu-Mayu Alternative
Haruko Maniax

Mirage titles
Soko ni Umi ga Atte
Anonymous

Φâge titles
Pikopiko: Koi Suru Kimochi no Nemuru Basho
Owarinaki Natsu, Towa Naru Shirabe
Shapeshifter

Third party titles
Rasen Kairō (published by Rúf)
Rasen Kairō 2 (published by Rúf)
D: Sono Keshiki no Mukōgawa (published by PurePlatinum/Ocarina (K.T. Factory))
School Days (sound production)
Summer Days (Game engine - rUGP)

References

External links
Official website
 
aNCHOR website

Hentai companies
Video game companies of Japan
Video game companies established in 1998
Japanese companies established in 1998
Avex Group